Pacific Theatre or Pacific Theater may refer to:

Theatres of war

World War II
 Asiatic-Pacific Theater, the theatre of operations of US forces in the Pacific War
 China Burma India Theater, the military designation for the China and Southeast Asian theatres
 Pacific Ocean theater of World War II
 Pacific War, the theatre of World War II that was fought in the Pacific and Asia

Other wars
 Asian and Pacific theatre of World War I
 Pacific Ocean Theatre, a theatre of operations during the Spanish–American War

Other uses
 Pacific Theatres, an American chain of movie theatre in the Los Angeles metropolitan area of California
 P.T.O. (video game) (Pacific Theatre of Operations), a 1989 video game developed and published by Koei

See also
 Pacific War (disambiguation)